Qarab, also rendered as Farab and Kerov, may refer to:
 Qarab-e Olya
 Qarab-e Sofla